Chrostosoma plagiata is a moth of the subfamily Arctiinae. It was described by Walter Rothschild in 1911. It is found in Peru.

References

Chrostosoma
Moths described in 1911